Şahin Aygüneş (born 1 October 1990) is a professional footballer who plays as a forward for Şile Yıldızspor. Born in Germany, he represented Turkey at youth international levels.

Club career
Born in Ansbach but raised in Hockenheim, Aygüneş started playing football with local FV 08 Hockenheim. Later he also went through the youth ranks of Waldhof Mannheim and finally Karlsruher SC where he also began his senior career. He moved to the Turkish side from German club Karlsruher SC, the club with whom he began his career. In summer 2009 he signed a five-year contract with Kasımpaşa. At the end of November 2009, he scored the third goal in Kasımpaşa shock 3–1 away at Fenerbahce. The goal came after he was substituted on after only three minutes.

International career
He has dual-nationality and was thus eligible for both Turkish and German national teams.

References

 Şahin Aygüneş Karşıyaka’da, kskhaber.com, 13 January 2016

External links
 
 
 Şahin Aygüneş Interview

1990 births
Living people
German people of Turkish descent
People from Ansbach
Sportspeople from Middle Franconia
Footballers from Bavaria
People from Rhein-Neckar-Kreis
Sportspeople from Karlsruhe (region)
Footballers from Baden-Württemberg
Association football forwards
Turkish footballers
German footballers
Turkey under-21 international footballers
Turkey youth international footballers
Karlsruher SC II players
Kasımpaşa S.K. footballers
Trabzonspor footballers
Antalyaspor footballers
Karşıyaka S.K. footballers
SV Sandhausen players
Gümüşhanespor footballers
Regionalliga players
Süper Lig players
TFF First League players
2. Bundesliga players